Yadanarbon Football Club is a Burmese professional football club based at the Bahtoo Stadium in Mandalay. The club was a founding member of the Myanmar National League in 2009. In the first round of the 2017 domestic league season, Yadanabon drew a home attendance of 4,000, the highest in that round.

2023 Final Squad

Continental record

Honours
It is the winner of the league's first two cup competitions: the MNL Cup 2009 and the MNL Cup 2009-10.

MNL Cup (2)
 2009, 2009–10

 Myanmar National League (4)
 2009–10, 2010, 2014, 2016

AFC President's Cup (1)
2010

Domestic league and cup history

Sponsorship

References

External links
 Yadanarbon FC

Association football clubs established in 2009
Myanmar National League clubs
2009 establishments in Myanmar
Football clubs in Myanmar
AFC President's Cup winning clubs